The 1990 Austral-Asia Cup was a cricket tournament held in Sharjah, UAE, between April 25–May 4, 1990. Six national teams took part: Australia, Bangladesh, India, New Zealand, Pakistan and Sri Lanka.

The teams were divided into two groups of three who played each other, round robin, with the winner and runner-up of each group progressing to the semi-finals.

Pakistan won the tournament, defeating Australia in the final, and won US$30,000. As runners-up, Australia won US$20,000, while the semi-finalists, New Zealand and Sri Lanka won US$10,000 each.

The tournament was sponsored by Sanyo.

Group stage

Group A

Group B

Knockout stage

Semi-finals

Final

See also
 Austral-Asia Cup

References

 Cricinfo tournament page
 Cricket Archive tournament page
 
 

International cricket competitions from 1988–89 to 1991
Austral-Asia Cup, 1990
1990 in Emirati sport
International cricket competitions in the United Arab Emirates